LBN may refer to:

 Lebanon, ISO 3166-1 alpha-3 code
 Lake Baringo Airport, Kenya
 Lamet language, a Mon–Khmer language of Laos, by ISO 639-3 code
 Letshego Bank Namibia
 Ligand bond number, the effective total number of ligands surrounding a metal center
 London Borough of Newham
 Lynds' Catalogue of Bright Nebulae, an astronomical catalogue
 Luohe West railway station, China Railway telegraph code LBN